Andrea Guerra is an Italian composer. He is noted for his film scores of Facing Windows (2003), Hotel Rwanda (2004), and The Pursuit of Happyness (2006).

Biography
Son of poet and screenwriter Tonino Guerra, Andrea Guerra was born in October 1961 in the northern Italian town of Santarcangelo di Romagna. After studying composition and arrangement under maestro Ettore Ballotta, he moved to Rome where he began his career composing music for nature documentaries. In succeeding years, he wrote several film scores for directors such as Ferzan Özpetek, Roberto Faenza, Giuseppe Bertolucci, and others.

In 2015, he made his debut in Bollywood by composing the film score of the Dum Laga Ke Haisha.

In 2016, he composed the background score for the Shah Rukh Khan-starrer Fan.

Filmography

Awards and nominations
 European Film Awards 2005 - Best Composer (Hotel Rwanda)
 Golden Satellite Awards 2005 - Best Original Song ("Million Voices", from the movie Hotel Rwanda, written by Andrea Guerra, Wyclef Jean and Jerry 'Wonder' Duplessis )
 Apex Award 2005 - Best Original Song ("Million Voices")
 Ravello CineMusic 2004 - Best Original Song ("Che ne sarà di noi")
 David di Donatello Awards 2003 - Best Composer (Facing Windows)
 Globo d'oro 2003 - Best Soundtrack (Facing Windows)
 Ciak d'oro 2003 - Best Soundtrack (Facing Windows)
 Silver Ribbon 2003 - Best Song ("Gocce di memoria")
 Italian Music Award 2003 - Best Song ("Gocce di memoria")
 Italian Music Award 2003 - Best Arrangement ("Gocce di memoria")
 Nino Rota Prize 2003 for the artistic quality of works
 FIPA (International Festival of Audiovisual Programs) d'Or Biarritz 2003 - Best Soundtrack (La guerra è finita)
 Flaiano Film Festival 2001 - Best Soundtrack (Le fate ignoranti)
 Italian Music Award 2001 - Best Soundtrack (Le fate ignoranti)
 Grolla d'oro 2001 - best composer (Tornando a casa)
 Film Festival in Valencia 2001 - Best Soundtrack (Tornando a casa)

Nominations
 David di Donatello Awards 2008 - Best Original Song ("Tear Down These Houses")
 Grammy Awards 2005 - Best Song from the film ("Million Voices")
 Golden Globe 2005 - Best Original Song ("Million Voices")
 David di Donatello Awards 2005 - Best Soundtrack (Cuore sacro)
 David di Donatello Awards 2004 - Best Soundtrack (Che ne sarà di noi)
 Globo d'oro 2003 - Best Soundtrack (Prendimi l'anima)

References

External links
 Official website
 

Year of birth missing (living people)
Living people
David di Donatello winners
European Film Award for Best Composer winners
Ciak d'oro winners
Nastro d'Argento winners
Italian film score composers
Italian male film score composers